is the 14th single by Japanese entertainer Miho Nakayama. Written by Chinfa Kan and Cindy, the single was released on November 14, 1988, by King Records.

Background and release
Following the success of Nakyama's 13th single "Mermaid" songwriters Kan and Cindy continued the fantasy concept with "Witches".

"Witches" became Nakayama's fourth consecutive No. 1 on Oricon's weekly singles chart and sold over 314,000 copies. The song also won the Grand Prix at the 17th FNS Music Festival.

Nakayama performed the song on the 39th Kōhaku Uta Gassen in 1988, making her debut on NHK's New Year's Eve special.

Track listing

Charts
Weekly charts

Year-end charts

References

External links

1988 singles
1988 songs
Japanese-language songs
Miho Nakayama songs
Songs with lyrics by Chinfa Kan
King Records (Japan) singles
Oricon Weekly number-one singles